The Campeonato Nacional de Rugby Feminino (English: National championship of Women's rugby) is the Portuguese top division of women's rugby. It is organised by the Portuguese Rugby Federation and was created in 2000, to fill the need of a women's league. Its inaugural winner was Pescadores da Costa da Caparica, who dominated the league alongside Agrária for the first five years. In 2007, Benfica broke their dominion and won three titles in a row, with Técnico stopping them in 2010. After another win for Benfica, Agrária won their fifth title in 2012, with Benfica matching that number in the competition last edition.

Since 2013, the league is only played in the rugby sevens variant, known as Circuito Nacional de Sevens Feminino. It started in 2003 and usually occurred after the rugby union season ended. Agrária dominated the competition until 2009, when Benfica won their first. They won four more titles, before being stopped by arch-rivals Sporting, who won back-to-back titles in 2016–17 and 2017-18.

History
The first year of an organised women's rugby league was only 2000–01, over 40 years later than their male counterpart. The first winners were Pescadores da Costa de Caparica from Almada. A year later, Pescadores narrowly lost the title to Agrária, who finished a point ahead. The third season was completely dominated by Agrária, after they won all of their matches. In 2003–04, the league changed in a different format with two groups, North and South, to determine the best four and the bottom four. In the championship playoff, Pescadores won all of their matches, taking the title out of Agrária. However, the students from the Escola Superior Agrária de Coimbra returned to the right path in 2004–05, beating Benfica by two points at the championship playoff. Agrária retained their title in the following year, before Benfica won their first league title in 2006–07. On the eight edition, the competition last stages changed from championship playoff to a Final Four, similar to other sports. On 26 January 2008, Benfica beat Agrária 21–3 to win their second consecutive title. They retain their league title in 2008–09, but in the following year, a new winner emerged: Técnico. It was the first team to break the decade-long reign of Agrária, Benfica and Pescadores. After losing the championship to Técnico the year before, Benfica dominated 2010–11, winning all of their matches and finishing with a 12-point lead. In 2011–12, Agrária won their first league title in six seasons. Although they ended level on points with Benfica, they received two more bonus points than Benfica. In what would be the last year of the competition in the traditional format played by 15 players, Benfica had another overwhelming season, winning all of their games, and conquering their fifth title.

Starting in 2013, the league has only been played in rugby sevens. This variant was first played in 2003–04, and its first six seasons were all won by Agrária. In 2009–10, Benfica was the second team to win the Circuito Nacional de Sevens Feminino, with Agrária regaining it in the following year. After one-off win by Técnico in 2011–12, Benfica won their second title in 2013, beating Técnico by 22–0. Since then, Benfica added two more league titles in 2014 and 2015, first beating SC Porto, and then Técnico. In 2016, Benfica completed the three-peat, remaining as the most dominant team of the past four years. After four years, Benfica was stopped by new contenders, Sporting, who won their first league title in 2016–17. A year later, Sporting retained their title, matching Benfica for points, but having more conversions.

Winners

Performance by Club

Rugby union

Sevens

References

Women
 
Sports leagues established in 2000
2000 establishments in Portugal
Portugal
Women's rugby sevens competitions